Trochilocharax ornatus (Hummingbird Tetra) is a species of characin endemic to Peru. This species is the only member of its genus.

References

Further reading 
 Der Kolibrisalmler - Trochilocharax ornatus gen. et spec. nov. – ein neuer Salmler aus Peru (Teleostei: Characiformes: Characidae) AXEL ZARSKE 

Characidae
Monotypic fish genera
Fish of South America
Fish of Peru
Taxa named by Axel Zarske
Fish described in 2010